was a town located in Ama District, Aichi Prefecture, Japan.

As of 2003, the town had an estimated population of 37,651 and a density of 4,035.48 persons per km2. The total area was 9.33 km2.

On March 22, 2010, Jimokuji, along with the towns of Miwa and Shippō (all from Ama District), was merged to form the new city of Ama.

External links

Ama official website 

Dissolved municipalities of Aichi Prefecture
Ama, Aichi